Fredrik Ericsson (born 18 September 1978) is a Swedish former professional road cyclist. He notably competed in the time trial at the 2008 UCI Road World Championships and won the Ringerike GP and the Swedish National Time Trial Championships the same year.

Major results

2003
 1st Skandisloppet
2004
 9th Overall Ringerike GP
2006
 3rd Overall Ringerike GP
 9th De Drie Zustersteden
2007
 6th Overall Ringerike GP
2008
 1st  Time trial, National Road Championships
 1st Overall Ringerike GP
 2nd Univest Grand Prix
 4th Scandinavian Open Road Race
 10th GP Copenhagen
 10th Tartu Grand Prix
2009
 National Road Championships
2nd Road race
2nd Time trial
 3rd Overall Ringerike GP
 4th Duo Normand
 5th Grand Prix Herning
 5th Scandinavian Race Uppsala
 6th Overall Tour du Gévaudan Languedoc-Roussillon
 6th Overall Okolo Slovenska
 6th Grand Prix Cristal Energie
 10th Overall Danmark Rundt
 10th Chrono Champenois

References

External links

1978 births
Living people
Swedish male cyclists
Sportspeople from Uppsala